Cricket must have reached Hertfordshire by the end of the 17th century. The earliest reference to cricket in the county is dated 1732 and is also the earliest reference to Essex as a county team. On Thursday, 6 July 1732, a team called Essex & Hertfordshire played London Cricket Club in a first-class match at Epping Forest "for £50 a side". The result is unknown.

Hertfordshire has not usually been considered a first-class county but its teams did appear frequently throughout the eighteenth century and played in some matches classified as first-class. There was a county organisation of sorts in 1838 and the present Hertfordshire County Cricket Club was founded on 8 March 1876. It joined the Minor Counties Championship for the very first season, 1895, and is the only one of the seven competing sides from that season to have maintained membership continuously ever since.

References

Bibliography
 
 
 
 
  
 
 
 
 
 
 
 
 

Cricket in Hertfordshire
English cricket teams in the 18th century
English cricket in the 19th century
Former senior cricket clubs
History of Hertfordshire